The 1956 Caen Grand Prix was a motor race, run to Formula One rules, held on 26 August 1956 at the Circuit de la Prairie, Caen. The race was run in very wet conditions over 70 laps of the circuit, and was won by over a minute by American driver Harry Schell in a Maserati 250F. British driver Roy Salvadori set pole and fastest lap.

Classification

References

Caen Grand Prix
Caen Grand Prix
Caen Grand Prix